Jay Mountain is the 79th highest peak of the Adirondack Mountains. It is located in Essex County, New York, in the Jay Mountain Wilderness Area, within the towns of Jay and Lewis.

Gallery

See also

Jay Mountain Wilderness Area
Adirondack Park

References

Mountains of Essex County, New York
Tourist attractions in Essex County, New York
Mountains of New York (state)